Dysprosium acetylacetonate is a compound with formula Dy(C5H7O2)3(H2O)n. It is a colorless solid. The dihydrate has been characterized by X-ray crystallography.

References

Dysprosium compounds
Acetylacetonate complexes